Aravind Bolar (born January 4, 1966) is an Indian actor who primarily works in Tulu and Kannada language films. Bolar began his career in Yakshagana, and he has acted in more than 100 plays and 50 plus films.

Personal life 
Aravind Bolar was born to Kirshnaapa Belchad and Sundari in Bolar in Mangalore district, Karnataka, India. Bolar married Savitri and they have two daughters, Kumari Suprita and Kumari Akshita.

Filmography

Tulu films

Kannada films

Konkani films

Television

List of Tulu movies
List of Tulu films of 2021
List of Tulu films of 2020
List of Tulu films of 2015
List of Tulu films of 2014
List of Released Tulu films
Tulu cinema
 Tulu Movie Actors
 Tulu Movie Actresses
Karnataka State Film Award for Best Regional film
RED FM Tulu Film Awards
Tulu Cinemotsava 2015

References

Sources

External links

Living people
Male actors from Mangalore
Mangaloreans
Tulu people
Male actors in Kannada cinema
Indian male film actors
Place of birth missing (living people)
Male actors in Tulu cinema
21st-century Indian male actors
1966 births